The European Softball Junior Boys Championship is the main championship tournament between national junior boys softball teams in Europe, governed by the European Softball Federation.

Results

Medal table

See also
ESF Women's Championship

References

External links
European Softball Federation

Softball competitions
European Softball Championship